Distomodus is an extinct genus of conodonts.

References

External links 

 

Prioniodontida genera
Silurian conodonts
Paleozoic life of Ontario
Paleozoic life of Quebec